Sir John Pirie, 1st Baronet (1781 – 26 February 1851), was a British shipbroker and Lord Mayor of London. He was the largest shipbroker in London.

In the 1830s he started to uphold Wakefield's principles and became a founding director, and one of the largest financiers, of the South Australian Company. He was also a director of the New Zealand Company, and the East India Company.

One of the first three ships despatched in 1836 to found the new colony of South Australia was the 105-ton two-masted schooner named John Pirie.

Pirie was elected Sheriff of London for 1831–32 and Lord Mayor for 1841–42. He was created a baronet, of Camberwell in the County of Surrey, in 1842 on his retirement as Lord Mayor.

Pirie had no children and died at Champion Hill, Camberwell on 26 February 1851. Although he was a past director of City of London and Tower Hamlets Cemetery Co he was buried at West Norwood Cemetery. The title died with him.

Pirie Street in Adelaide and the city of Port Pirie were also named after him.

References

1781 births
1851 deaths
Baronets in the Baronetage of the United Kingdom
Sheriffs of the City of London
19th-century lord mayors of London
19th-century English politicians
19th-century Australian politicians
Directors of the South Australian Company
Burials at West Norwood Cemetery